Julian Robert Huffman (March 31, 1924 – April 16, 2015) was an American weatherman, voice-over announcer, director and children's show host. He was most well known as the host of WSAZ's Mr. Cartoon from 1969 to 1995.

Early life
Jule Huffman was born in Cincinnati, Ohio on March 31, 1924 to Leroy Huffman and Cecilia Silverman-Huffman.

Career
Prior to joining WSAZ, he served in the US Air Force during World War II. He worked as an aircraft repair and maintenance technician on a carrier in the South Pacific.

Jule was hired by WSAZ in 1953 as a vocalist for the WSAZ variety daytime show Coffee Time. He did commercials, and was a director, a voice-over announcer, and a weatherman. He starred in two kid shows (Steamboat Bill as Merlin the Sea Monster, the early iteration of Mr. Cartoon) prior to becoming Mr. Cartoon.

Mr. Cartoon
Huffman took over the reins of Mr. Cartoon in 1969 after the original actor, George Lewis, left for a job in Maryland. The role made him a beloved and trusted icon in the Tri-State community. He played the role until his retirement in 1995. The series was cancelled after Huffman retired.

Personal life
Huffman married Gladys Huffman in 1941. The couple had 4 children. They remained married for 70 years, until her death on May 2, 2011 at the age of 84. His son, Marvin Huffman, wore the Mr. Cartoon character Beeper costume during event appearances.

As a native of Cincinnati, he was an avid Reds and Bengals fan, and sang the National Anthem at several Reds Games, as well as participating in many Red Caravans.

He reportedly loved golf and gardening, and singing, often performing at notable events in West Virginia, Ohio, and Kentucky.

Death
Jule Huffman died in Huntington, West Virginia on April 16, 2015 at the age of 91. His funeral was held at the First Presbyterian Church in Huntington on April 23, 2015. He is interred near his wife, Gladys, at the White Chapel Memorial Gardens in Barboursville, West Virginia.

References

External links

1924 births
2015 deaths
People from Cincinnati
People from Huntington, West Virginia
American television meteorologists
American military personnel of World War II